FC Partizan Minsk was a Belarusian football club based in Minsk.

History 

The club was founded as MTZ-RIPO Minsk in 2002 as a merger of two Minsk teams from the Second League (Traktor Minsk, a club with a 55-year history, and Trudovye Rezervy-RIPO Minsk, a football academy-based team which only spent one season in the Second League). The merge allowed the new team to have its own football school to recruit young players from as well as financial supply from the Minsk Tractor Works, the main sponsor of Traktor Minsk.

MTZ-RIPO Minsk started playing in the Second League in 2002. In their first season the team finished first, and then did the same in the First League in 2003. Since 2004, they played in Belarusian Premier League.

At the end of 2004 the club was acquired by a Russian-Lithuanian businessman Vladimir Romanov and became a part of his football holding alongside Scottish Premier League club Hearts and Lithuanian A Lyga club FBK Kaunas. During 2005–2010 many foreign players owned by FBK Kaunas or Hearts had successful loan spells in MTZ-RIPO.

Before the start of the 2010 season, the club announced a name change. On 27 January 2010, the new name was revealed to be Partizan Minsk.

Partizan finished the 2010 season at bottom of the table and were relegated. In the following season in the Belarusian First League, they finished second and had to face FC Vitebsk in a two-legged play-off, which they won 3–2 on aggregate to secure a place in the 2012 Belarusian Premier League.

In early 2012, the club was mostly abandoned by Romanov (who withdrew his financial support, having some legal troubles himself) and had to release all players. Partizan withdrew from the Premier League, leaving it with only 11 teams. The team spent the 2012 season playing at the amateur level in Minsk Championship. In 2013, they renamed to Partizan-MTZ Minsk and joined the Second League, before renaming back to Partizan Minsk in 2014. Midway through 2014, season the club announced its withdrawal from the league and was folded.

Honours 
 Belarusian Premier League
 3rd place (2): 2005, 2008
 Belarusian Cup
 Winners (2): 2005, 2008

Supporters 
The club had a fierce rivalry with Dinamo Minsk. The support across the two Minsk clubs was drawn across political lines, with Dinamo fans being strongly right-wing and Partizan fans being strongly left-wing. Partizan fans were known for their anarchist, anti-government, anti-fascist, and pro-LGBT rights stances. As a result of their political views, they had a strong friendship with fans of Arsenal Kiev and SV Babelsberg.

Former managers 
Andrei Zygmantovich
Eduard Malofeev
Yuri Puntus
Alexandr Piskarev

League and Cup history 

1 Including additional game (1–2 loss) against Lokomotiv Vitebsk for the 1st place.
2 Including additional game (4–1 win) against Lokomotiv Vitebsk for the 14th place.

MTZ-RIPO in Europe

References

External links 
Official Website
FC MTZ-RIPO at National Football Teams.com
FC MTZ-RIPO at Football-Lineups.com

 
Association football clubs established in 2002
Defunct football clubs in Belarus
Football clubs in Minsk
2002 establishments in Belarus
Association football clubs disestablished in 2014
2014 disestablishments in Belarus